Thomas Verducci (born October 23, 1960) is an American sportswriter who writes for Sports Illustrated and its online magazine SI.com. He writes primarily about baseball. He is also a reporter and commentator for Fox Major League Baseball and MLB Network.

Early life and education
Verducci was born in East Orange, New Jersey, and raised in Glen Ridge. He attended Seton Hall Prep in West Orange, New Jersey, and then went to Penn State, graduating with a B.A. in journalism, where he was a reporter for The Daily Collegian and appeared in the first edition of The Weekly Collegian. On July 12, 2016, Verducci revealed he was a Mets fan growing up.

Writing career
After a one-year stint at Florida Today, Verducci moved to New York Newsday in 1983, becoming a columnist in 1990. He began writing for Sports Illustrated in 1993. In 2005, while writing for Sports Illustrated, Verducci briefly joined the Toronto Blue Jays as an outfielder for spring training. He is a regular guest on The Dan Patrick Show.

His most recent work is titled The Cubs Way. The book chronicles the story of how Theo Epstein and a perfect 5-year plan took the Cubs from a 101-loss season in 2012 to the 2016 World Series Champions.

In Oct. 2020, Verducci spent a month in the MLB's "Playoff Bubble" covering the postseason for FOX's MLB broadcast. He appeared on Sports Illustrated's daily cover on Oct. 27, 2020.

Broadcasting career
In addition to his writing duties, Verducci works in television. He works for MLB Network, where he serves as a "baseball insider" and co-host of several programs with Bob Costas. He called his first World Series in 2014 for Fox alongside Joe Buck and Harold Reynolds. Verducci was the first non-former player or manager to work in the broadcast booth as a color commentator for a World Series telecast (and any pro sports) since ABC's Howard Cosell in 1983. Verducci and Reynolds would be replaced by John Smoltz as Fox's top baseball analyst following the 2015 season. He worked the 2016 Fall Classic as a sideline reporter, a role he still has to this day, and as a studio analyst, only doing so for 2016.

Personal life
Verducci lives in the Belle Mead section of Montgomery Township, New Jersey, with his wife, Kirsten, and two sons. His brother Frank Verducci was the offensive coordinator for UConn. Verducci's aunt is Joan Hodges, the widow of Gil Hodges.

References

External links
 Column archive at Sports Illustrated
 
 
 

1960 births
Living people
Major League Baseball broadcasters
YES Network
Sports Illustrated
American sportswriters
American sports journalists
American writers of Italian descent
Writers from East Orange, New Jersey
People from Glen Ridge, New Jersey
People from Montgomery Township, New Jersey
MLB Network personalities
Donald P. Bellisario College of Communications alumni
Seton Hall Preparatory School alumni